Roscoe Dexter Dix (June 11, 1839September 5, 1912) was a Michigan politician who served as Michigan Auditor General from 1897 to 1900.

Early life
Dix was born in Jefferson County, New York on June 11, 1839, to parents Dexter Ozias and Mary Eliza Dix. Dix is distantly related to Robert Treat.

Military career
Dix fought with the Union Army in the American Civil War. Dix was injured in a battle in Knoxville, Tennessee, in which he was permanently disabled.

Career
At some point in his life, Dix had various jobs, including that of a barber, a real estate agent, and a banker. From 1887 to 1890, Dix served as Michigan land commissioner. Dix served as the Michigan Auditor General from 1897 to 1900.

Personal life
On January 2, 1867, Dix married Virginia M. Kephart. Together, they had at least three children. Dix was a member of the Grand Army of the Republic.

Death
Dix died on September 5, 1912, in Berrien Springs, Michigan. He was interred at Rose Hill Cemetery in Berrien Springs.

References

1839 births
1912 deaths
Union Army soldiers
Michigan Auditors General
Michigan Republicans
American politicians with disabilities
People from Jefferson County, New York
People of Michigan in the American Civil War
Burials in Michigan
19th-century American politicians